The 2018 Tour de Luxembourg was the 78th edition of the Tour de Luxembourg road cycling stage race. It was held between 30 May and 3 June, as a 2.HC event as part of the 2018 UCI Europe Tour.

Schedule

Teams
Ten UCI Professional Continental teams and five UCI Continental teams made up the fifteen teams that participated the race. Of these riders, only 84 finished the race.

UCI Professional Continental Teams

 
 
 
 
 
 
 
 
 
 

UCI Continental Teams

Stages

Prologue
30 May 2018 — Luxembourg City to Luxembourg City,  (ITT)

Stage 1
31 May 2018 — Luxembourg City to Hesperange,

Stage 2
1 June 2018 — Junglinster to Schifflange,

Stage 3
2 June 2018 — Eschweiler to Differdange,

Stage 4
3 June 2018 — Mersch to Luxembourg City,

Classification leadership table

Final classification standings

General classification

Points classification

Mountains classification

Young rider classification

Teams classification

Notes

References

External links

Tour de Luxembourg
Tour de Luxembourg
Tour de Luxembourg
Tour de Luxembourg
Tour de Luxembourg